Thomas Paul Hinnershitz (April 6, 1912  – August 1, 1999) was an American race car driver.
Hinnershitz was active through the 1930s, 1940s and 1950s on dirt, asphalt and boards, driving "Big Cars" (later Sprint Cars), at that time slightly smaller versions of Indianapolis cars that could be raced on half mile dirt race tracks.

Over his 30-year career, he captured 103 American Automobile Association (AAA) and United States Auto Club (USAC) victories and seven AAA/USAC East Coast sprint car championships in 1949–1952, 1955–1956, and 1959. He also raced in some national champ car (30 AAA and 4 USAC) events. His top career finish was three 4th-place finishes (1946 Lakewood Speedway (AAA), 1951 Williams Grove Speedway (AAA), and 1956 William Grove (USAC)).

He mainly raced his own cars (not for other owners) and he was the mechanic on his cars. He was one of the first drivers to have car sponsorship. Hinnershitz was known for racing wearing overalls, which drew in fans at fairgrounds races in Corn Belt states such as Iowa and the Minnesota.

Background and personal life
He was born Thomas Paul Hinnershitz on a farm near Oley, Pennsylvania. He farmed a  farm on weekdays and raced on the weekend.

He married Betty Selmen in 1935. They had a daughter Jean in 1939 and a daughter Carol in 1943.

Racing career
Hinnershitz began racing in 1930 with a 1914 Model T at Reading Fairgrounds Speedway. The car cost him $25; he won his first race and $75 earned for the victory. He later was quoted, "Boy, I was really rich then. That was the best investment I ever made in a race car." His early career saw successes at Williams Grove Speedway and Reading Fairgrounds Speedway near his home in Pennsylvania. He joined the AAA in 1932.

He raced his midget car with a boat outboard motor at the 1/6 mile, 45 degree Nutley, New Jersey bicycle board track Velodrome in the late in 1930s. Hinnershitz's passed his Indianapolis Motor Speedway test in 1939 but didn't qualify for the race. He won the first feature at Williams Grove Speedway, a AAA Sprint car race.

Hinnershitz won the AAA Eastern Sprint Car championships in 1949, 1950, 1951, 1952, and 1955. AAA stopped sanctioning racing and USAC took over sanctioning for 1956. He won USAC Eastern Sprint Car championships in 1956 and 1959.

In the 1950s, he became one of the first drivers to have a car sponsor. He carried the Miracle Power fuel additive sponsorship while racing with an Offenhauser race engine.

Retirement and life after racing
Hinnershitz retired from racing in 1960 three hours after witnessing his friend Johnny Thomson die at a Allentown Fairgrounds race in Pennsylvania. "I had been thinking about retiring for several weeks," Hinnershitz was quoted. "But I won't say what happened to John didn't help me make it definite. I quit for two reasons. One, I didn't approve of some of the new drivers and their driving philosophies. Two, my hands were gone. I simply couldn't grip the wheel well enough." He held 39 track records at his retirement. A. J. Foyt was quoted in his biography A.J.: "Of all the drivers on dirt Tommy Hinnershitz stands out in my mind as the best. Man, he had that sprint car up on two wheels, one wheel up on its side, whatever it took. And he almost never turned it over."

Hinnershitz continued to work in the racing field for several more years as an Indy car mechanic. He died on August 1, 1999.

Nicknames
He was nicknamed "The Flying Dutchman", "The Flying Farmer", and "Oley Dirt Farmer".

Legacy

Career awards
Hinnershitz was inducted into the Pennsylvania Sports Hall of Fame in 1975.
Hinnershitz was inducted into the Eastern Motorsport Press Association Hall of Fame in 1975.
Hinnershitz was inducted into the National Sprint Car Hall of Fame in the first class of 1990.
Hinnershitz was inducted into the Motorsports Hall of Fame of America in 2003.
Hinnershitz was inducted into the United States Auto Club Hall of Fame in 2016.

Biography
Ludwig, Gary. "Tommy Hinnershitz - The Life and Times of an Auto-Racing Legend." . Basket Road Press Inc. 2009.

Race Title
Williams Grove Speedway hosts a "Tommy Hinnershitz Classic" is an All Star Circuit of Champions sprint car race as of 2019.

Indianapolis 500 results

References

1912 births
1999 deaths
Racing drivers from Pennsylvania
Indianapolis 500 drivers
National Sprint Car Hall of Fame inductees
AAA Championship Car drivers
People from Berks County, Pennsylvania